Fur Patrol is a rock band, originally from Wellington, New Zealand.

The band formed in Wellington in 1996. Their debut EP, Starlifter, was released on the independent Wellington label Wishbone in 1998. Their debut album Pet was produced by David Long, and was released in 2000, also on Wishbone Records. Pet  featured the single "Lydia" which reached number one on the New Zealand singles charts. The band scooped the pool at the 2001 Tui New Zealand Music Awards, walking away with four Tuis.

In 2001 the band moved to Melbourne, Australia where they signed their first major record deal, with Universal Music Australia. Their second album, Collider, was released in New Zealand in 2003 and Australia in early 2004. The album, produced by British producer Mark Wallis and recorded in Melbourne's Sing Sing studios, was a move away from the catchy, more radio-friendly pop sound of Pet. The first single, Precious, was heavier and darker than earlier offerings. Its music video, which showed the band members collecting fan's ears, was filmed in Hollywood.

Fur Patrol became a three-piece when Guitarist Steve Wells left the band in late 2004.

The 3-piece released the 4-track Long Distance Runner EP in May 2007 and their third full-length album Local Kid on 29 September 2008. Local Kid was produced by Australian producer Tony Cohen.

Current members
Julia Deans (vocals and guitar)
Andrew Bain (bass)
Simon Braxton (drums)

Past members
Steve Wells (guitar)

Live photos

Discography

Albums

Singles

References

External links
Fur Patrol's MySpace page
All Those Other Stupid Things
Club Fur – Yahoo Group established in 1999

APRA Award winners
New Zealand rock music groups